Heiligen-Lexicon, oder Lebensgeschichten aller Heiligen by Johann Evangelist Stadler is a book of hagiography published in Augsburg in 1861. It contains biographical information on several saints, including:
Abias
Abiatha, Hathes and Mamlacha
Abibion

References
Holweck, F. G. A Biographical Dictionary of the Saints. St. Louis, MO: B. Herder Book Co. 1924.

Christian hagiography
German books
1861 books